James M. Petro (born October 25, 1948) is an American lawyer and politician of the Republican Party who served as the Attorney General of Ohio.  Previously, Petro also served as Ohio State Auditor and he was a candidate for the Republican nomination for Governor of Ohio during the 2006 Ohio primaries, but lost to Ken Blackwell.

Early life and early career
Petro was born October 25, 1948 in Brooklyn, Ohio. A Brooklyn High School graduate, he attended Denison University in Granville, Ohio where he received his Bachelor of Arts degree and joined the Lambda Chi Alpha fraternity. He later earned his J.D. degree from Case Western Reserve University School of Law in Cleveland, Ohio. Petro served as an Assistant Prosecuting Attorney for Franklin County as a trial lawyer responsible for felony prosecutions, and then as Assistant Director of Law for the city of Cleveland, Ohio. After starting his private practice, Petro became prosecuting attorney for the city of Rocky River, Ohio.

Political career
Petro began his political career in 1977 when he was elected to the Rocky River city council, and later served as the director of the city.  In 1980, he was elected to the Ohio House of Representatives.  He served four years as a state representative.

In 1991, Petro became  County Commissioner for Cuyahoga County; during his four-year term he was President of the board for a year.

Petro was elected Ohio Auditor in 1994 and re-elected in 1998, serving two terms from 1995 to 2003.  As Auditor he served as the chief inspector and supervisor of public offices in the state; the office is the largest state auditing agency in the United States, second in size only to the United States Government Accountability Office.

In November 2002, Petro was elected the Ohio attorney general, serving from 2003 to 2007.  In 2005, Petro became the first Ohio attorney general to argue a case in front of the United States Supreme Court in over thirty years; he won the case by a vote of nine to zero.  As Ohio's Attorney General he successfully defended the law banning late term abortions in the state.  As attorney general, Petro also launched an effort that added 210,000 criminal DNA profiles from Ohio to the national Combined DNA Index System (CODIS).

Candidacy for Governor

On January 30, 2006, Petro announced that Joy Padgett would be his running mate for the Governor's position.  Padgett, a Republican state senator from Coshocton, Ohio, was selected after Petro's first running mate, Hamilton County Commissioner Phil Heimlich, dropped out of the campaign to run for re-election as Commissioner of Hamilton County.

Petro was defeated in the May 2, 2006 primary by Ken Blackwell, Ohio's then-Secretary of State.

Legal work and False Justice
Petro became the first attorney general in the country to intervene in a case spearheaded by the Innocence Project, a non-profit legal clinic that pioneered the use of DNA testing to prove wrongful conviction. The case exonerated Clarence Elkins, a family man with no prior criminal record who had been sentenced to life in prison for the murder of his mother-in-law.
  
After his involvement in subsequent high-profile cases including Dean Gillispie. Petro and his wife Nancy co-authored False Justice: Eight Myths that Convict the Innocent, which raises questions regarding the fairness of our justice system and identifies flaws in how police and prosecutors handle evidence, especially in capital cases. The book also examines how the authors believe DNA evidence has played a critical role in exonerating convicted people and highlight what the authors call the unreliability of eyewitness testimony.

Board of Regents
Petro was appointed chancellor of the Ohio Board of Regents in March 2011 by Governor John Kasich. Chancellor Petro leads the University System of Ohio, which is one of the largest comprehensive systems of public higher education in the nation. The University System of Ohio bears the primary responsibility for raising Ohioans' educational attainment.

Publications

References

1948 births
Case Western Reserve University School of Law alumni
Chancellors of the University System of Ohio
Denison University alumni
Living people
Republican Party members of the Ohio House of Representatives
Ohio Attorneys General
People from Brooklyn, Ohio
Politicians from Cleveland
State Auditors of Ohio